Carlos Rocuant (died October 1966) was a Chilean cyclist. He competed in the team pursuit event at the 1928 Summer Olympics.

References

External links
 

Year of birth missing
1966 deaths
Chilean male cyclists
Olympic cyclists of Chile
Cyclists at the 1928 Summer Olympics
Place of birth missing